Evelyn Nguleka (January 26, 1970 in Zambia–February 5, 2017 in Lusaka) was a veterinarian, farmer, and President of the World Farmers Organisation.

Biography 
Raised by her grandmother in Ndola, Nguleka attended Fatima Girls' Secondary School. She earned a degree in veterinary medicine from the University of Lusaka. She also gained an international diploma in poultry handling from Barneveld College in the Netherlands. Nguleka was a small farmer who specialized in poultry and goats, and in treating diseases in these animals.

She became the first female president of the Zambia National Farmers’ Union (ZNFU) upon her election in 2013. She supported the rights of small farmers and often brought up inconsistencies in how farmers of different crops and farm sizes were treated as a homogenized group.

Upon her election to the presidency of the World Farmers Organisation (WFO) in 2015, she stated: "For too long the role of the farmer was taken for granted, almost as if we were vending machines for food, called to respond to that role, who carry out with joy the task of feeding the planet in a compulsory and annihilating way, without margins of profits." While serving as the president of the WFO, she lived mainly in Switzerland.

In September 2016, she resigned from both the WFO and ZNFU, after being charged and arrested by the Zambian Drug Enforcement Commission alongside ZNFU Executive Director Ndambo Ndambo for corruption. This occurred after the Finnish and Swedish embassies ordered audits for Finnish and Swedish companies that had worked with ZNFU after suspected mismanagement of donations. 

She died of an illness in 2017.

References 

1970 births
2017 deaths
Zambian women farmers
Women veterinarians
People from Ndola